This is a timeline of the presence of Eastern Orthodoxy in Greece from 1974 to 2008. The history of Greece traditionally encompasses the study of the Greek people, the areas they ruled historically, as well as the territory now composing the modern state of Greece.

Third Hellenic Republic (from 1974) 

1974 Metr. Seraphim of Ioannina is elected Archbishop of Athens and all Greece (1974–1998); the Cathedral of Saint Andrew in Patras is inaugurated, being the largest church in Greece, housing the relics of Saint Andrew the Apostle; Esphigmenou Monastery (Athos), a stronghold for the conservative Greek Old Calendarists, withdrew its representative from the common meetings of the Holy Community at Karyes (the administrative center of Mount Athos), accusing the Patriarchate of being ecumenist, and refusing to commemorate the Patriarch; death of Blessed Sophia of Kleisoura (Myrtidiotissa in Schema), the ascetic of Kleisoura, Fool-for-Christ.

1975 Death of Papa-Dimitris (Gagastathis);  Article 3 of the Greek Constitution officially declares the prevailing religion in Greece as Eastern Orthodoxy under the authority of the autocephalous Church of Greece, united in doctrine to the Ecumenical Patriarchate.
1976 The Dimotiki (Demotic) language form of Modern Greek was made the official language, replacing the purified and formal Katharevousa language of Modern Greek which had been in use for nearly two centuries since foundation of the modern Greek state.
1977 Death of noted Greek theologian and professor Panagiotes N. Trembelas; conversion of French theologian and Cistercian monk Placide Deseille (fr), together with two other Cistercian monks, Séraphim (Pyotte) and Elie (Ragot), who received baptism from Igumen Emilian of Simonopetra on Mt. Athos, later accepting the schema and being ordained as hieromonks of the Simonopetra brotherhood, subsequently founding various Athonite Metochia of Simonopetra in France.
1978 Abortions are legalised in Greece but only under certain specific circumstances; through the efforts of Metr. Panteleimon (Chrysofakis) of Thessalonica, the sacred relics St. David of Thessalonica (David the Dendrite) were triumphantly returned to Thessaloniki from Milan, Italy, after having been taken by Crusaders in 1236 AD; the Holy Synod of the Church of Greece founded the Integration Centre for Returning Migrants, Immigrants, Asylum Seekers and Refugees (KSPM).
1979 Martyrdom of Archimandrite Philoumenos (Hasapis) of Jacob's Well.
1980 Greece and the Holy See formally established diplomatic relations; death of Elder Philotheos (Zervakos) of Paros; Orthodox-Roman Catholic Joint Commission for Theological Dialogue, 1st plenary, met in Patmos and Rhodes; Extraordinary Joint Conference of the Sacred Community of Mount Athos, 9–22 April, resolved publicly to state the opinion of the Athonite fathers on the subject of dialogue with the heterodox; Greek priest-monk Fr. Athanasios Anthides travelled to India to begin a systematic Orthodox Mission in the rural area of Arambah, in West Bengal state, in eastern India; death of Patr. Benedict I of Jerusalem, who had actively pursued a rehabilitation of the Church of the Holy Sepulchre.
Member State of the European Community (European Union)
1981 Greece becomes the 10th member of the European Community, 1 January; conservatives of the Esphigmenou Monastery (Athos) refuse common market aid to Mt. Athos; Adultery is decriminalized in the penal code.
1982 Death of Archimandrite Haralambos Vasilopoulos, founder of the Pan-Hellenic Orthodox Union in 1959 («Πανελληνίου Ορθοδόξου Ενώσεως» (Π.Ο.Ε.)) and its organ Orthodoxos Typos, and a faithful defender of the Orthodox Faith, being the author of over 300 publications including books exposing occultism and anti-Christian sects; death of renowned lay preacher and Orthodox writer Dimitrios Panagopoulos (1916-1982); glorification of the Venerable Eugenios of Aetolia († 1682); monotonic orthography was imposed by law on the Greek language, however the Greek Orthodox Church continues to use polytonic orthography; civil marriage is introduced in Greece in 1982, although the overwhelming majority still marries in church and Orthodox clergymen sometimes refuse burial rites and other rights to those not married in church.

1983 Death of Elder Arsenios the cave-dweller of Mt. Athos.
1984 Orthodox-Roman Catholic Joint Commission, 3rd plenary, meets in Khania, Crete; professor Georgios Mantzaridis publishes "The Deification of Man" , setting forth the theological and anthropological basis for the doctrine of deification as expounded by St. Gregory Palamas (1296-1359).
1986 Root of Jesse icon of the Mother of God in Andros (the "Myrovlytissa"), begins gushing myrrh; glorification of Arsenios the Cappadocian (†1924) by the Patriarchate of Constantinople; the performance of abortions was further liberalized by Law No. 1609 of 28 June 1986."
1987 In April, parliament approved a law to expropriate monastic land in order to redistribute some to poor peasants, and to take over administration of urban church-owned assets, however Abp. Seraphim (Tikas) of Athens was victorious in preventing the government from expropriating church landholdings, by allowing some land redistribution while opposing nationalisation of church and monastery land; on August 19 Patr. Pimen of Moscow and All Russia, and Ec. Patr. Demetrios I of Constantinople co-celebrated the Divine Liturgy on the Feast of the Transfiguration at the Holy Trinity St. Sergius Monastery, being the first concelebration in 398 years (since January 1589).
1988 Canonization of Eustathius of Thessalonica (†1197); Mount Athos and the Meteora are designated as UNESCO World Heritage sites; radio station "Church of Piraeus 91.2 FM" begins transmitting in October, through the efforts of Metr. Kallinikos (Karousos) of Piraeus (1978-2006); death of Fr George Pirounakis, a turbulent cleric who opposed the right-wing dictatorship of 1967–1974, supported student uprisings against the junta, and later demanded that bishops who had succoured the tyrants should be held to account.
1989 Hellenic Bible Society publishes a translation of the New Testament into the modern vernacular (Demotic Greek), The New Testament diglot, containing both the Patriarchal edition of 1904, along with a parallel translation in Today's Greek Version, having the blessing, approval and endorsements of the Ecumenical Patriarchate of Constantinople, the Holy Synod of the Church of Greece, the Patriarchate of Alexandria, the Patriarchate of Jerusalem, and the Pedagogical Institute of the Greek Ministry for Education and Religion; Mystras is designated as a UNESCO World Heritage site;
1990 Bilateral declarations of both Greece and Israel are made on 21 May 1990 in which they normalized their diplomatic relations, essentially recognizing the special interest of the Greek Government in a Greek Orthodox presence in the Holy Places, as well as its right to have a say in any future arrangements concerning the religious status quo and the rights and privileges of the Patriarchate of Jerusalem; the monasteries of Daphni (Athens), Hosios Loukas (Beotia) and Nea Moni of Chios, are designated as UNESCO World Heritage sites; death of Fr. Athanasios Anthides, first Greek Orthodox Missionary to India, succeeded a year later by priest-monk Fr. Ignatios Sennis, who came to Calcutta to continue the mission; the Friends of Mount Athos society is formed, with Metr. Kallistos (Ware) of Diokleia as president, including Prince Philip (Duke of Edinburgh) and Prince Charles (The Prince of Wales) among its members.
1991 Death of Elder Porphyrios (Bairaktaris) the Kapsokalivite (Evangelos (Bairaktaris)) 7 February; Kyriopascha occurs; Greek Orthodox Archdiocese of Italy is created; syncretistic synod of the Antiochian Patriarchate convened and presided over by Patriarch Ignatius IV of Antioch, and attended by the heretical Monophysite Jacobite Syrian Patriarch Ignatius Zakka, implements a series of measures aimed at achieving full union with the Monophysite Syriac Churches, declaring their patriarchates to be "sister churches" despite the Christological differences, and allowing joint prayer in the agreed statement.

1992 Synaxis of primates of Orthodox churches in Constantinople; Patr. Diodoros I of Jerusalem presented a list of firm declarations of Orthodox convictions of the Patriarchate of Jerusalem, which was entered into the minutes of the assembly of Orthodox leaders at the Phanar on the Sunday of Orthodoxy; on 4 November 1992, the Holy Synod of the Church of Greece unanimously declared Bp. Chrysostomos of Smyrna (†1922) an Ethnomartyr and a Saint of the Eastern Orthodox Church, to be jointly commemorated on the Sunday before the Feast of the Elevation of the Holy Cross, together with four other Holy Hierarchs of Asia Minor including: Bp. Ambrosios Moschonision, Bp. Euthymios (Agritellis) of Zela (†1921), Bp. Gregorios of Kidonion (†1922), and Bp. Prokopios of Iconium (†1923); in June, Patr. Alexy II of Moscow visits Church of Greece; deaths of Eldress Gabrielia (Papayannis) and Chrysanthi of Andros; the total congregation of the Patriarchate of Jerusalem in 1992 was estimated at 145,000 Greek Orthodox Palestinians in the Occupied Territories, Israel and Jordan, representing the largest Christian congregation in historic Palestine, and Jerusalem in particular.
1993 Church of Cyprus condemned Freemasonry as a religion incompatible with Christianity; Orthodox-Roman Catholic Joint Theological Commission meets in Balamand, Lebanon, issuing common document "Uniatism: Method of Union of the Past, and Present. Search for Full Communion" (the "Balamand declaration"), equating the Orthodox and Roman Catholics as "sister churches", and concluding that rebaptism should be avoided, while "'uniatism' can no longer be accepted either as a method to be followed nor as a model of the unity our Churches are seeking".

1994 Death of Elder Paisios (Eznepidis) of Mt. Athos, 12 July; Greek Parliament passes a resolution marking 19 May as "Pontus Genocide Remembrance Day"; the Liaison Office of the Orthodox Church to the European Union was established in Brussels by the Holy Synod of the Ecumenical Patriarchate; Museum of Byzantine Culture is inaugurated in Thessaloniki.
1995 Elder Ephraim of Philotheou begins founding Athonite-style monasteries in North America; death of Eldress Macrina of Volos; Ecumenical Patr. Bartholomew I visits Patmos as part of the celebration of the 1,900th anniversary of the writing of the Book of Revelation by the Evangelist John.

 1996 Greek Orthodox Archdiocese of North and South America is reorganized by the Ecumenical Patriarchate, dividing the administration of the two continents into four parts (America, Canada, Central America, and South America); in his thesis Clash of Civilizations professor Samuel P. Huntington argued that one geopolitical alliance in the post-Cold War world would be an Eastern-Christian bloc, linking Russia, Serbia and Greece.
1997 A bomb explodes at the Ecumenical Patriarchate of Constantinople, seriously injuring Orthodox deacon Nectarius Nikolou and damaging several buildings, being the third such attack in recent years, following the ones in 1994 and 1996; Thessaloniki is the cultural capital of Europe (1997); posthumous recognition by the State of Israel of Metr. Joachim (Alexopoulos) of Demetrias for saving the lives of 700 people during World War II who were hidden by the residents of the villages of Mount Pelion, having his name inscribed in the Holocaust Museum in Washington, and entered on the Righteous Honor Wall at Yad Vashem in Jerusalem; in the case of Canea Catholic Church v. Greece (143/1996/762/963), the European Court of Human Rights (ECtHR) held unanimously that the Greek courts had violated article 6 of the European Convention on Human Rights by refusing to acknowledge that the Canea Catholic Church in Crete had legal personality.
 

1998 Archbishop Christodoulos (Paraskevaides) was enthroned in Athens as the new head of the Greek Orthodox Church (1998–2008); Archbishop Christodoulos makes first official visit of a Greek Primate to the Ecumenical Patriarchate of Constantinople in 24 years (since 1974); establishment of the Office of the Representation of the Church of Greece to the European Union in Brussels; death of Elder Ephraim of Katounakia; death of missionary Archimandrite Chariton Pneumatikakis, having served the Orthodox mission in Kananga, Democratic Republic of the Congo, for 25 years (1973-1998); by an overwhelming parliamentary majority, including both major parties (PASOK and ND), the separation of church and state was excluded (in 1998) from the constitutional revision that was eventually completed in April 2001; Thessaloniki Summit held to discuss Orthodox participation in WCC; on 8 December the Bioethics Committee of the Church of Greece was created to study contemporary bioethical problems in depth from a scientific viewpoint based on Orthodox ethos and the theological perception of man, society and values; Greek parliament affirmed the genocide of Greeks in Asia Minor as a whole (Pontian and Anatolian Ottoman Greeks), and designated 14 September a day of commemoration.
20th century Notable Greek Orthodox modern writers include: Metr. John Zizioulas of Pergamon; Archimandrite Vasileios Gontikakis; Prof. Christos Yannaras; Prof. Fr. John S. Romanides (†2001); Bp. Hierotheos (Vlachos) of Nafpaktos; Protopresbyter Nikolaos Loudovikos; Protopresbyter George Metallinos; Protopresbyter Theodore Zisis; Prof. Georgios Mantzaridis; and Panayiotis Nellas (†1986), among others.
2000–2001 Government of Greece orders removal of compulsory reference to religious affiliation on state identity cards, despite widespread campaigns against this from the Church of Greece and the majority of the public.
2001 Death of Elder Haralambos Dionysiatis, teacher of noetic prayer; on the first trip to Greece by a Pope since AD 710, Pope John Paul II of Rome apologizes to Orthodox Church for Fourth Crusade; a day earlier some 1,000 Orthodox conservatives took to the streets to denounce his visit; in March, Abp. Christodoulos (Paraskevaides) of Athens blessed the Hellenic Genocide Petition Effort, which urged that the government not violate Law 2675/98 by deleting the term "genocide" when explaining the destruction of Hellenism in Asia Minor; Abp. Christodoulos (Paraskevaides) of Athens visits the Patriarchate of Moscow, being also received by Russian President Vladimir Putin; pastoral agreement between the Coptic Orthodox Church and Greek Orthodox Patriarchate of Alexandria and all Africa, agreeing to accept the sacrament of marriage which is conducted in either Church, as well as performing all other sacraments to that new family of Mixed Christian Marriage; death of distinguished scholar Dimitri Obolensky, Russian-born historian who traced the influence of Byzantine civilisation in Eastern European identity.

2002 The Holy Synod of the Church of Greece rejected a proposal to introduce Modern Greek into the Divine Liturgy (similar to what the Second Vatican Council did for the Roman Catholic Church by allowing the use of the vernacular for the Mass), opting to keep Koine Greek as it was spoken 2,000 years ago and used in New Testament texts; Metropolis of Glyfada is established as a new metropolis separating from Metropolis of Nea Smyrni; Ecumenical Patriarch Bartholomew I of Constantinople declared the monks of Esphigmenou Monastery (Athos) as being in schism with the Eastern Orthodox Church; Patr. Bartholomew I (Archontonis) of Constantinople and Pope John Paul II co-sign Venice Declaration of Environmental Ethics.
2003 Abp. Christodoulos (Paraskevaides) of Athens inaugurated the Office of the Representation of the Church of Greece to the European Union in Brussels; Orthodox Churches in Europe commemorated the 550th anniversary of the Fall of Constantinople in May; the Greek Minister of Culture Evangelos Venizelos informs Europarliament session that the status of the monasteries on Holy Mount Athos and its way of life will remain unchanged, citing official recognition of this status fixed in Article 105 of the Greek Constitution and also legally confirmed in the special Athens Treaty clause specifying conditions on which Greece joined the European Union; Abp. Christodoulos (Paraskevaides) of Athens has falling out with Ecumenical Patriarch Bartholomew over who should have the final say in the appointment of bishops in northern Greece, but rift is mended three weeks later; in February, the Holy Synod of the Greek Orthodox Church issued a statement opposing the threat of war in Iraq; the Church of Greece sent more than 20 tons in humanitarian aid for the refugees of the war in Iraq to be distributed along the Jordanian-Iraqi border; the proposal to build a mosque outside Athens before the 2004 Olympics was blocked due to opposition from residents and Greece's Orthodox Church which disagreed with the location and plans for the funding for the multimillion-pound mosque to come from Saudi Arabia's King Fahd; the 5th Academic Meeting between Judaism And Orthodox Christianity was held in Thessaloniki, Greece, on 27–29 May; Inter-Orthodox Consultation on the Draft Constitutional Treaty of the European Union is held in Herakleion, Crete, from 18 to 19 March 2003; death of Elder Serapheim Savvaitis (8 January / 26 December), Hegumen of the Holy Lavra of Saint Sabbas the Sanctified (1957-2003).
2004 In September, a helicopter carrying Patr. Petros VII (Papapetrou) of Alexandria along with 16 others (including 3 other bishops of the Church of Alexandria) crashed into the Aegean Sea while en route to the monastic community of Mount Athos with no survivors; on 8 October the Holy Synod of the Orthodox Church of Greece decided to restore the female diaconate for senior nuns in monasteries; more than two years after he was elected to the post, Israel stated that it would recognise Patr. Irineos I as the Greek Orthodox Patriarch of Jerusalem, after a long-standing refusal to endorse Irineos, describing him as the "candidate of the Palestinians."

2005 Church of Greece hosted the WCC World Conference on Mission and Evangelism in Athens, the first in an Orthodox country in the history of this body; the Ecumenical Patriarchate issued the "General Regulations for the Establishment and Operation of Holy Monasteries in the Greek Orthodox Archdiocese of America" [Protocol #95] on 16 February, regulating monasticism in America; Britain's Prince Charles arrived on the monastic community of Mount Athos for a three-day visit in May; Vladimir Putin becomes the first Russian state leader to visit Mount Athos; in October, the "Grey Wolves" Turkish terrorist group staged a rally outside the Ecumenical Patriarchate in Phanar, proceeding to the gate where they laid a black wreath, chanting "Patriarch Leave" and "Patriarchate to Greece", inaugurating the campaign for the collection of signatures to oust the Ecumenical Patriarchate from Istanbul.
2006 Abp. Christodoulos (Paraskevaides) of Athens visits Vatican, the first head of the Church of Greece to visit the Vatican, reciprocating the Pope's visit to Greece in 2001, signing a Joint Declaration on the importance of the Christian roots of Europe and protecting fundamental human rights; Abp. Christodoulos castigated globalisation as a "crime against humanity"; Abp. Christodoulos welcomed the imminent arrival of millions of Orthodox faithful from Bulgaria and Romania into the EU from 1 January 2007, saying the influx "will strengthen the voice of Orthodoxy" to address a perceived threat to national and religious identity posed by globalisation; foundation of the Special Synodic Committee for Migrants, Refugees and Returning Migrants (SCMRM) at the initiative of Abp. Christodoulos, following the approval of the Holy Synod in Nov. 2006; Prime Minister Costas Karamanlis took a three-day pilgrimage to Mount Athos; Pope Benedict XVI met with Greek Orthodox Seminarians from the Apostoliki Diakonia theology college in Greece who were visiting Rome, urging them to confront the challenges that threaten the faith by working to unify all Christians; the church reported that there were 216 men's monastic communities and 259 for women along with 66 sketes, with a total of 1,041 monks and 2,500 nuns, witnessing to a modern modest revival in monasticism; in September, barely 48 hours after a Somali Islamic cleric called for Muslims to kill the Pope, Abp. Christodoulos told a sermon in Athens that Christians in Africa were suffering at the hands of "fanatic Islamists", citing the example of Roman Catholic monks who were slaughtered the previous year "because they wore the cross and believed in our crucified Lord"; Abp. Christodoulos criticized the authors of a state issued elementary school sixth grade history textbook, as attempting to conceal the Church's role in defending Greek national identity during Ottoman occupation, the book being later removed in 2007; death of Elder Athanasios Mitilinaios, having authored thousands of recorded lectures in the spirit of patristic traditional Orthodoxy; a ruling by a first-instance court in Athens approved the formation of an association of people who worship the 12 gods of Mount Olympus, linked to New Age practises by the Church of Greece; government of Greece announces it will fund and build a €15 million (US$19 million) new mosque in Athens, to be the first working mosque in the Greek capital since the end of Ottoman rule over 170 years prior, welcomed by Abp. Christodoulos (Paraskevaides) of Athens and the Church of Greece in accordance with its established position.
2007 The 1600th anniversary celebration of the repose of John Chrysostom; Greek Minority Lyceum at the Phanar (Megali tou Genous Sxoli, today a middle and high school of the Greek minority) wins a judgement condemning Turkey at the European Court of Human Rights (ECHR), for violation of the European Convention On Human Rights (protection of property); the International Association of Genocide Scholars (IAGS) passed a resolution affirming "that the Ottoman campaign against Christian minorities of the Empire between 1914 and 1923 constituted a genocide against Armenians, Assyrians, and Pontian and Anatolian Greeks"; Representation of the Church of Cyprus to the European Union is established by decision of the Holy Synod of the Church of Cyprus; New English Translation of the Septuagint (NETS) is published by the International Organization for Septuagint and Cognate Studies (IOSCS), based on the best critical editions of the Septuagint, primarily the larger Göttingen Septuagint; a half-finished painting in the Church of the Holy Virgin in Axioupolis, northern Greece, of Russian communist leader Vladimir Lenin cutting off the beard of St Luke (Voino-Yasenetsky), painted as a symbol of communist oppression of the Church, offended traditionalists who wanted it removed. 
2008 Death of Abp. Christodoulos (Paraskevaides) of Athens, proving to be one of the most popular archbishops in Greek history, reviving the appeal of the Church in a secular age, especially among young people;

See also

Eastern Orthodoxy in Greece
List of archbishops of Athens
Greek Orthodox Church
Eastern Orthodox Church organization
History
History of the Eastern Orthodox Church
History of Eastern Christianity
History of the Eastern Orthodox Church under the Ottoman Empire
History of Eastern Orthodox Churches in the 20th century
Timeline of Eastern Orthodoxy in America
Church Fathers
Apostolic Fathers
Church Fathers
Ante-Nicene Fathers (book)
Desert Fathers
Nicene and Post-Nicene Fathers
List of Church Fathers

Notes

References

Bibliography
 Giannēs Koliopoulos and Thanos Veremēs. Greece: The Modern Sequel, from 1831 to the Present. NYU Press, 2002. 407 pp. 
 Anastasios Anastassiadis. Religion and Politics in Greece: The Greek Church's 'Conservative Modernization' in the 1990s. Research in Question, No.11, January 2004. (PDF).
 C.M. Woodhouse. Modern Greece. 4th ed. Boston : Faber and Faber, 1986.
 Charalambos K. Papastathis and Nikos Maghioros. "Greece: A Faithful Orthodox Christian State. THE ORTHODOX CHURCH IN THE HELLENIC REPUBLIC." In: Javier Martínez-Torrón and W. Cole Durham, Jr.. Religion and the Secular State: National Reports (Issued for the occasion of the XVIIIth International Congress of Comparative Law, Washington, D.C., July 2010). Published by: Complutense Universidad de Madrid, in cooperation with The International Center for Law and Religion Studies, Brigham Young University. July 2014. pp. 339–375.
 Demetrios J. Constantelos. Understanding the Greek Orthodox Church: Its Faith, History and Life. 4th Edition. Brookline, Mass.: Hellenic College Press, 2005. 
 Dimitri E. Conomos, Graham Speake. Mount Athos, the Sacred Bridge: The Spirituality of the Holy Mountain. Oxford: Peter Lang, 2005.
 Dr. Daphne Halikiopoulou. Patterns of Secularization: Church, State and Nation in Greece and the Republic of Ireland. Ashgate Publishing, Ltd., 2011. 
 Effie Fokas. Religion in the Greek Public Sphere: Nuancing the Account. Journal of Modern Greek Studies. Volume 27, Number 2, October 2009, pp. 349–374.
 Efthymios Nicolaidis. Science and Eastern Orthodoxy: From the Greek Fathers to the Age of Globalization. Transl. Susan Emanuel. Johns Hopkins University Press. 2011. 288 pp.  
 Herman A. Middleton. Precious Vessels of the Holy Spirit: The Lives & Counsels of Contemporary Elders of Greece. 2nd Ed. Protecting Veil Press, 2004.
 John Hadjinicolaou (Ed.). Synaxis: An Anthology of the Most Significant Orthodox Theology in Greece Appearing in the Journal Synaxē from 1982 to 2002. Montréal : Alexander Press, 2006.
 John L. Tomkinson. Between Heaven and Earth: The Greek Church. Anagnosis Books, Athens, 2004.
 Mother Nectaria McLees. EVLOGEITE! A Pilgrim's Guide to Greece. 1st Ed. St. Nicholas Press, Kansas City, MO, 2002. 927 pp.
 Norman Russell. Modern Greek Theologians and the Greek Fathers. Philosophy & Theology Volume 18, Issue 1. 2007.10.17. Pages 77–92.
 Rev. Dr. Nicon D. Patrinacos (M.A., D.Phil. (Oxon)). A Dictionary of Greek Orthodoxy – Λεξικον Ελληνικης Ορθοδοξιας. Light & Life Publishing, Minnesota, 1984.
 Rev. A. H. Hore. Eighteen centuries of the Orthodox Greek Church. London: James Parker & Co. 1899. 706pp. (Re-printed: Gorgias Press LLC, 2003.)
 Vasilios Makrides (Professor). Hellenic Temples and Christian Churches: A Concise History of the Religious Cultures of Greece from Antiquity to the Present. New York University Press, 2009. 345 pp. 
 Victor Roudometof and Vasilios Makrides (Eds.). Orthodox Christianity in 21st Century Greece: The Role of Religion in Culture, Ethnicity, and Politics. Ashgate Publishing, Ltd., 2010. 258 pp. 

20th century in Greece
21st century in Greece
Cultural history of Greece
Greek Orthodoxy in Greece
Orthodoxy in Greece
History of Eastern Orthodoxy in Greece
History of Greece since 1974
Orthodox Church